Randal may refer to:

People
Given name
Randal and Randall (given names), English-language masculine given names.
Randal Gaines, American politician
Rand Paul, United States Senator

Surname
Allison Randal, a linguist, software developer and author.
Ariane Randal, a French journalist
Hakon Randal, (born 1930), a Norwegian politician.

Fictional people/characters
Randal Graves, character in Kevin Smith's Clerks and Clerks II.
Randal Ivory, the titular protagonist of Randal’s Friends, or RANFREN for short

Places
Randal, Iran, a village in Gilan Province, Iran
Randal Tyson Track Center, a 5,500-seat indoor track in Fayetteville, Arkansas, USA
 Randal, a hamlet of le Vrétot, a French commune in Normandy

Other
Randal Óg CLG, a Gaelic Athletic Association club, founded in 1953.
"Lord Randall" or "Lord Randal", a British ballad

See also
Randall  (disambiguation)